The President of the States of Alderney, also known as the President of Alderney, is the elected head of Alderney's legislature, the States of Alderney and the Leader of Alderney. The Presidency is the latest of a variety of political positions to govern the island. The office was established in 1949 after a new constitution establishing Alderney as a subordinate part of the Bailiwick of Guernsey.

History 
Before the office of President was established, the leaders of Alderney were the Judges of Alderney, who were appointed as representatives of the Crown in Alderney. During the Second World War, the majority of the population of Alderney was evacuated. In the Occupation of the Channel Islands by Nazi Germany, Alderney was used by the Nazis as a location for two concentration camps. After the Liberation, less than 50% of Alderney's population returned, leading to an urgent discussion taking part in the Parliament of the United Kingdom because land boundaries and property documents had been destroyed.

Since 1949 

In 1947, His Majesty's Privy Council decided that Guernsey would take over administration of Alderney. In 1948 the Alderney (Application of Legislation) Law was passed by both the States of Guernsey and the States of Alderney, which removed Alderney's sovereignty. The law provided for the establishment of the office of President of Alderney to be the elected leader of Alderney in civil life under the Lieutenant-Governor of Guernsey.

The President is elected for a four-year term and is also the chairman of the States of Alderney. The President also holds the right to vote in the States of Alderney; however, this is only used to make the deciding vote in the event of a tied vote. The next election for President will be in 2024.

Duties

The President's Office is responsible for the following:

 Production and issue of the Billet D'Etat, Deliberations and Hansard Reports
 Dealing with Members of the Public and other Government offices
 Official Flag Flying 
 Organising civic and social events including Vin d'Honneurs and visits by dignitaries
 Honours and Awards

List of presidents of Alderney

See also 

 Leader of Alderney

References 

Politics of Alderney